Daniller is a surname. Notable people with the surname include:

Hennie Daniller (born 1984), South African rugby union footballer 
Tertius Daniller (born 1989), South African rugby union player